Czechs in the United Kingdom refers to the phenomenon of Czech people migrating to the United Kingdom from the Czech Republic or from the political entities that preceded it, such as Czechoslovakia. There are some people in the UK who were either born in the Czech lands or have Czech ancestry, some of whom descended from Jewish refugees (e.g. Kindertransport) who arrived during World War II.

Population
The 2001 UK Census recorded 12,220 Czech-born people resident in the UK. With the accession of the Czech Republic to the European Union in May 2004, Czechs gained the right to live and work elsewhere in the EU, and large numbers moved to the UK for work, although there has been substantial return migration. The Office for National Statistics estimates that 45,000 Czech-born immigrants were resident in the UK in 2013. The 2011 UK Census recorded 34,615 Czech-born residents in England, 1,256 in Wales, 2,245 in Scotland, and 662 in Northern Ireland. The figure for Scotland includes people who specified that they were born in Czechoslovakia, but the figures for England, Wales and Northern Ireland do not. 1,279 people in England, 39 in Wales and 16 in Northern Ireland are recorded as having been born in Czechoslovakia without specifying the Czech Republic or Slovakia.

Notable people with Czech ancestry

 Milan Baroš, footballer
 Roman Bednář, footballer
 Patrik Berger, footballer
 Georgina Bouzova, actress
 Alf Dubs, Baron Dubs, politician
 Petr Čech, footballer
 Josef Franc, motorcycle speedway rider
 Vera Fusek, actress
 Eva Hayman, Holocaust survivor, diarist and nurse
 Anna Hájková, historian
 Eva Jiřičná, architect
 Jan Kaplický, architect
 Jan Kavan, diplomat and politician
 Čeněk Kottnauer, chess master
 Karel Kuttelwascher, fighter pilot
 Sir Frank William Lampl, Life President of Bovis Lend Lease
 Miroslav Liskutin, fighter pilot WW2
 Herbert Lom, actor
 Dan Luger, English rugby union player
 Ivan Margolius, author, architect and propagator of Czech culture and technology
 Jan Pinkava, animator, film director
 Hana Maria Pravda, actress
 Dominic Raab, politician
 Karel Reisz, film director
 Tom Stoppard, screenwriter, playwright

See also

 Demographics of the Czech Republic
 Czech people
 White Other
 Czech Republic–United Kingdom relations
 Czech Americans

References

External links
 www.pohyby.co.uk - Czech and Slovak community portal in the UK - more than 24000 members
 Czech and Slovak Club in London
  British Czech and Slovak Association
  Czech Centre London
 Czech Radio London

United Kingdom
United Kingdom
 
Immigration to the United Kingdom by country of origin
Czech Republic–United Kingdom relations